is the fourth single by the Japanese girl idol group Team Syachihoko, to be released in Japan on June 19, 2013 by Unborde Records (Warner Music Japan). The single is positioned as the group's "Japanese pre-major debut single".

Track listing

Japanese Edition (Regular Edition)

Nagoya Edition (Nagoya & Venue Edition)

Charts

References

External links 
 Warner Music Japan profiles
 Team Syachihoko "Shuto Iten Keikaku" (Japanese Edition)
 Team Syachihoko "Shuto Iten Keikaku" (Nagoya Edition)

Team Syachihoko songs
2013 singles
Japanese-language songs
Unborde singles